NGC 1989 (also known as ESO 423-21) is a lenticular galaxy in the Columba constellation. It is about 482 million light-years away from the Milky Way. The galaxy was discovered by John Herschel on January 28, 1835. Its apparent magnitude is 12.9 and its size is 1.40 by 1.1 arc minutes.

References

External links
 

Lenticular galaxies
423-21
-05-14-04
1989
017464
Columba (constellation)
Astronomical objects discovered in 1835
Discoveries by John Herschel